Afrodacarellus euungulae is a species of mite in the family Rhodacaridae.

This species was formerly a member of the genus Afrogamasellus.

References

Rhodacaridae
Articles created by Qbugbot
Animals described in 2003
Taxa named by Wolfgang Karg